"Just Say" is a song produced by British DJ KDA, featuring vocals by American singer Tinashe. It was released on 15 July 2016 to digital outlets by Ministry of Sound.

Music video
The song's music video was directed by Sarah McColgan and premiered on 25 October 2016 on KDA's Vevo account. It features Tinashe dancing in various neon-lit spaces, including a parking lot, a motel room, an empty roadside diner and a phone booth.

Track listings

Digital download
"Just Say" – 3:52

Digital download (Remixes EP), Vol. 1
"Just Say" (KDA Dub)  – 7:12
"Just Say" (Joshua James Remix)  – 6:40
"Just Say" (Ashley Beedle Remix)  – 8:14
"Just Say" (Kabuki Remix)  – 4:52

Digital download (Cassius Remix)
"Just Say" (Cassius Remix)  – 6:14

Digital download (Faithless Remix)
"Just Say" (Faithless Remix)  – 5:58

Charts

References

External links

2016 singles
2016 songs
Tinashe songs